BoBoiBoy Movie 2 is a 2019 Malaysian Malay-language computer-animated superhero comedy film produced by Animonsta Studios. Directed by Nizam Razak, who also co-wrote the screenplay with Anas Abdul Aziz, it is the standalone sequel to BoBoiBoy: The Movie (2016) and first season of TV series BoBoiBoy Galaxy. The film follows BoBoiBoy and his friends as they fight an ancient villain named Retak’ka, who plans to absorb BoBoiBoy's elemental powers.

BoBoiBoy Movie 2 was simultaneously released in Malaysia, Indonesia, Brunei, and Singapore on 8 August 2019. The Vietnamese dub of the film was released in Vietnam on 30 August 2019.

Plot

Gopal and BoBoiBoy retrieve a Power Sphera among a penguin monster's eggs. He drops the egg while trying to switch it with the Power Sphera, releasing a baby, inviting the mother's attention, not before escaping. BoBoiBoy notices Adu Du and Probe with the Power Sphera, before Fang defeats them and calls Yaya to rescue them. BoBoiBoy rescues Adu Du and Probe before they depart in their base.

A group of alien miners find someone within crystal. 100 years ago, he clashed with someone before he was sealed within, while the group were complimented for rescuing all Power Spheras given, He introduces himself as Retak'ka escaping the crystal with a remnant of his powers. Claiming to be the first master of the Elements, he blackmails the leader Kechik to locate BoBoiBoy and TAPOPS for Power Spheras in exchange for more crystals.

The group land at Tok Aba's Kokotiam, Papa Zola meets Mama Zila with their daughter, Pipi Zola. BoboiBoy invites Fang for dinner at Aba's home. Adu Du and Probe plan to obtain EggaBot, but the Zolas defeat them on board. Koko Ci transmits an emergency message saying TAPOPS Station was attacked. Ochobot teleports to Planet Quabaq, but BoBoiBoy insists on going to TAPOPS Station. They saw that Retak'ka laid waste to everyone on it.

Retak'ka overpowers him even with everybody else. Telling BoBoiBoy that splitting makes him weaker, he drains Solar, Thunderstorm, Cyclone and Thorn, and ensnares the station as Darkwood. Gopal saves BoBoiBoy, and tries to save everyone aboard before Ochobot urgently takes them to Planet Quabaq. As they leave, Koko Ci tells BoBoiBoy to find Hang Kasa. Adu Du gets smitten by Ayu Yu before GogoBugi blows the station up. They went to Planet Quabaq, landing near an acidic river.

BoBoiBoy and Ochobot rush to read the message sent before Gopal tells everyone to leave the sinking ship. They were ambushed by Kang Kongs, which are passive towards light. Due to Retak'ka taking his Solar element, BoBoiBoy transforms to Blaze, detransforming after running out of energy. Another figure saves them from the Kang Kongs, before the group wake up at his camp. Introducing himself as Hang Kasa, he offers to train them to face his former disciple Retak'ka.

Retak'ka goes to several planets to upgrade his Elements by absorbing their energy. Kaizo reveals that he rescued everyone on the TAPOPS Station and placed a tracker on the miners' craft. Fang and Kaizo went to Planet Gur'latan, finding out that Retak'ka killed all the soldiers. Yaya and Ying trace Retak'ka and his crew to Planet Bayugan, where he plans to upgrade his Wind element. Ying warns the inhabitants about Retak'ka.

The miners locate BoBoiBoy near Planet Rimbara. Kaizo's side evacuates the Cendawa Tribe on Rimbara. With the last one finally on board, Retak'ka begins to absorb Rimbara's energy and traps Kaizo's ship, barely managing to lift off. Yaya, Ying and Fang distract Retak'ka. BoBoiBoy and Gopal come to know that the sooner they complete their training, the sooner they'll return home.

The Zolas come across the restricted area discovering that it was filled with technology. BoBoiBoy and Gopal were forced to pay training fees. Gopal only has one dollar, so Kasa takes BoBoiBoy's Quake Element as debt and traps them in crystal. Meanwhile, Zola finds out that Kasa fixed Ochobot's databank at the basement. In a message, Koko Ci told them to go to Quabaq to find a way against Retak'ka.

Kasa reveals that he was the original master of the Crystal Element and Retak'ka's old friend who discovered him on the landfill Planet Gugura and were best friends. He discovered CrystalBot while Retak'ka discovered GammaBot. Retak'ka became greedy for more Elements and went for Kasa's Crystal power, but Kasa drained the Elements within him, sealing him within crystal. Retak'ka tells them to meet at Earth, stating if he had not came across Fang, Yaya and Ying, he wouldn't have known that the planet contains all 7 Elements. Kasa arrives to trick Retak'ka by saying that the real him cannot come due to a stomach ache. Pipi frees BoBoiBoy and Gopal before fully charging EggaBot. Retak'ka outpowers his former master before almost killing him. BoBoiBoy takes the blow, pinning him to a rock. With BoBoiBoy in danger, Gopal joins the fight. Zola defeats the miners within EggaBot and Adu Du gets smacked by Ayu Yu. Kasa decides to return the Quake Element, encouraging him to stand up against Retak'ka and apologizes for lying to him.

Remembering that splitting makes him weaker, BoBoiBoy fuses into FrostFire. Gopal provides Ochobot to absorb his Elements. Retak'ka fights the remainder, only to beaten down. Refusing to accept defeat, Retak'ka destroys a nearby dam. BoBoiBoy freezes him with Glacier, taking the last Element and blasts him to space as Supra. He collapses into the river but was rescued by the team.

BoBoiBoy was treated for his injuries while Zila scolds Zola for taking Pipi aboard. The Power Spheres were given to Amato, with Maskmana asking if he should be helping BoBoiBoy. He replies that BoBoiBoy needs to be independent with a more important mission in waiting.

Cast

English dub

Production 
The film's director Nizam Razak stated that the process of filmmaking for this second film is faster than the first film and only took one year to be finished. They enforced a 12-month deadline to see if they can make a film without jeopardising the quality or the storyline of the animation. He admitted there is pressure in completing the movie on time but his production team of 100 people managed to do that within that time. They used better technology such as Redshift and comprehensive simulation method even though the cost will be higher to give the best quality to the audience. If the reaction to this film is positive, they plan to make movies consistently, with a new film every one year or every one-and-a-half year.

Music 

The official song for the film, "Fire & Water", is written and performed by Faizal Tahir, after Animonsta Studios approached him. He described the opportunity to sing the theme song as a platform to approach young fans. Its official lyric video was released on 27 June 2019 and the music video was released on 26 July 2019. The iTunes release came on 2 August 2019, alongside all songs in his latest album, Rojak.

Release 
Before the release of BoBoiBoy: The Movie in 2016, Nizam Razak stated that they already have their ideas for the second film.

Initially, this would be the first Malaysian film to be released simultaneously in Malaysia, Indonesia, Brunei, Singapore, and Vietnam. However, the Vietnamese release was postponed to 30 August in order to allow time to produce a full Vietnamese dub version. For the Indonesian market, it is distributed by CBI Pictures while for the Vietnamese market, the film is distributed by CGV Cinemas and Mani Entertainment.

There were requests to release the film in Thailand and the Philippines, as well as plans to target South Korea, India and China for future releases.

Reception 

Animonsta Studios targets the film to collect more than the first film (RM15.70 million) as the number of cinemas that show this film is higher. The film collected the biggest-grossing local animation film on its first day, raking in RM1.18 million. It achieved its target by overtaking the first movie after eight days, collecting RM15.80 million. In 18 days, the film collected RM25 million within three weeks. It overtook Upin & Ipin: Keris Siamang Tunggal (2019) to become the fourth highest-grossing local film in Malaysia and the highest-grossing animation film in Malaysia, including all local and international animation films, after collecting RM27.70 million for 26 days. However, the title of the highest-grossing animation film in Malaysia was later taken by Ejen Ali: The Movie and Frozen II, which respectively grossed RM 30.8 million and RM 41.67 million.

In 70 days, BoBoiBoy Movie 2 reached RM30 million (US$7.4 million) in Malaysia, and in Brunei, Singapore and Vietnam with RM29.57 million (US$7.3 million), becoming the third highest-grossing local film within Malaysia at that time.

Awards and nominations

References

External links 
 
 BoBoiBoy Movie 2 on Cinema.com.my
 BoBoiBoy Movie 2 Official Website

2019 films
2019 3D films
Malay-language films
2010s superhero films
Malaysian animated films
2019 computer-animated films
2019 comedy films
Animonsta Studios
Films directed by Nizam Razak